Super Inggo 1.5: Ang Bagong Bangis (lit. The New Wildness) is a prequel installment of the series as a prelude following the same title in 2006 after 1 year and it was aired for 7 weeks only.

Plot
In Super Inggo 1.5: Ang Bagong Bangis, Budong/Super Inggo continues his exciting journey as the ultimate Pinoy kid superhero. Can the power of his pure, kind heart overpower his haunting past? Will this be enough for him to save his family and friends from the Prince of Darkness and his legions?

What is the measure of a true superhero? This is the question that our young protagonist will try to answer in Super Inggo 1.5. Budong and his family have transferred to the town of San Roque after fleeing their old town Sto. Nino, which was attacked by giant monsters. He will meet Lola Facunda, the mother of Pacita and Super Inday; as well as new friends such as Bokia, the talking cellphone (a play on the cellphone brand, Nokia); and Chin-Chin Tsinelas, Budong's crush.

Cast and characters

Recurring
 Makisig Morales as Super Inggo/Budong
 Jairus Aquino as Jomar
 Joshua Dionisio as Mighty Ken
 Andrew Muhlach as Amazing Teg
 Kathryn Bernardo as Maya
 Empoy as Horshie
 Zanjoe Marudo as Super Islaw
 Meryll Soriano as Super Inday
 Nova Villa  as Lola Juaning
 Angelu de Leon as Pacita
 Kaye Abad as Cynthia
 Brad Murdoch as Leandro (POD)
 Jacob Dionisio as Jack (POD's alter ego)
 Chris Martinez as Joe Diokno
 Herbert Bautista as Kumander Bawang

Additional
 Ian Galliguez as Sheryl
 Liza Lorena - as Lola Facunda - mother of Pacita & Super Inday
 John Prats as Protec-Thor - sent by Kumander Bawang to watch over Budong and help him during dire circumstances. He is also one of the new Super heroes recruited in Power Academy. His powers are heightened sense of smell, touch, and hearing.
 Bobby Andrews as Binatang X - Super Islaw's rival. He will use Budong to seek revenge against Super Islaw. He had also his love interest Pacita.
 Erich Gonzales as Maeboo - she has the ability to bring the dead back to life in zombie form. To her, her powers is a curse, so she decided to join Prince of Darkness to rid herself of her powers.
 Dionne Monsanto as Salonna - a salon owner seeking revenge against shallow individuals who only look at good looks of a person.
 Marvin Raymundo as Nenok - has the ability to steal the power of superheroes. His power is limited by the fact that once he steals a new power, his previous power will return to its original owner.
 Jaymee Joaquin as Bianca Bankera/Barracuda - has the ability to call the creatures of the sea. This ability was given to her by boyfriend who is a merpeople.
 Khaycee "KC" Aboloc as Golden Bibe - Super Inday's pet duck morphed into a girl.
 Mel Martinez, Bebe Gandanghari, Whitney Tyson, & Lilia Cuntapay as Super Inday's alter egos
 Tess Antonio as Tina
 Jennifer Illustre as Manilyn - the Chenelyn Witches.
 Eric Fructuoso as Tikbalang King
 Minnie Aguilar as Chin-Chin Tsinelas
 Ray Allen as "Bokia" (the talking cellphone) (a play on the cellphone brand Nokia)

See also
Super Inggo
List of programs broadcast by ABS-CBN
List of programs aired by ABS-CBN

External links
Super Inggo 1.5 at Super Inggo 1.5 Telesryes TV Heaven
Super Inggo
Super Inggo 1.5 Teleserye on Demand

References

ABS-CBN drama series
Fantaserye and telefantasya
2007 Philippine television series debuts
2007 Philippine television series endings
Sequel television series
Superhero television shows
Filipino-language television shows
Television series about children